Pathrakadavu waterfalls is a waterfall situated in the Silent Valley National Park in Palakkad district, Kerala, India. This tourist place is situated in Kuruthichal in Pathrakadavu.

Hydroelectric project and disputes 
There was a proposal of an hydroelectric project  in the river which this waterfall is located. There were so many agitations on the construction of hydroelectric project in the river by different environmental organisations and activists. Even forest department protested against this.

Ecotourism project 
Now, government is trying to implement an ecotourism project here that will not harm the environment and protect the beauty of nature in Silent valley.

References 

Tourist attractions in Palakkad district
Waterfalls of Kerala